Emmet Michael Walsh (March 6, 1892 – March 16, 1968) was an American prelate of the Roman Catholic Church. He served as bishop of the Diocese of Charleston in South Carolina (1927–1949) and as bishop of the Diocese of Youngstown in Ohio (1952–1968).

Biography

Early life 

The eighth of eleven children, Emmet Walsh was born on March 6, 1892, in Beaufort, South Carolina, to Thomas and Wilhelmenia (née Jennemann) Walsh. In 1906, his family moved to Savannah, Georgia. 

After graduating from Savannah High School in 1910, he studied for the priesthood at St. Bernard's Seminary in Rochester, New York.

Priesthood 
Walsh was ordained a priest in Georgia for the Diocese of Savannah by Bishop Benjamin Keiley on January 15, 1916. After his ordination, Walsh served as a curate at the Immaculate Conception Parish in Atlanta until 1917, when he became pastor of St. Teresa's Parish in Albany, Georgia. He was also charged with the missions in Southwest Georgia, giving him a jurisdiction of 1,000 Catholics over 16,000 square miles. Walsh was named pastor of St. Patrick's Parish in Savannah, Georgia, in 1921, then returned to Immaculate Conception Parish to serve as a pastor in 1923.

Bishop of Charleston 
On June 20, 1927, Walsh was appointed the sixth bishop of the Diocese of Charleston by Pope Pius XI. He received his episcopal consecration on September 8, 1927, from Bishop Michael Keyes, with Bishops Patrick Barry and William Hafey serving as co-consecrators, at the Cathedral of St. John the Baptist in Savannah. At age 35, Walsh was then the youngest American bishop. During his 22-year tenure in Charleston, he erected 25 new churches, four new hospitals, and two vacation camps for youth. He also served as chair of the National Catholic Welfare Conference's Legal Department and secretary of the Bishops' Meeting at the Catholic University of America in Washington, D.C.

Bishop of Youngstown 
Pope Pius XII named Walsh as coadjutor bishop of the Diocese of Youngstown and titular bishop of Rhaedestus on September 8, 1949. In 1951, President Harry S. Truman appointed Walsh to the Internal Security and Individual Rights Commission, which was formed to investigate subversive activities. Walsh automatically succeeded Bishop James A. McFadden on November 16, 1952. During his tenure, the diocese experienced a period of great growth. Walsh became an assistant at the pontifical throne in 1954, and attended the Second Vatican Council in Rome from 1962 to 1965.

Death 
Emmet Walsh died on March 16, 1968, in Youngstown, Ohio, at age 76.

References

1892 births
1968 deaths
People from Beaufort, South Carolina
20th-century Roman Catholic bishops in the United States
Participants in the Second Vatican Council
Roman Catholic bishops of Youngstown
Roman Catholic bishops of Charleston